Jay Stauffer Jr. is a Distinguished Professor of Ichthyology at Pennsylvania State University.

Background
He received his BS from Cornell University in 1972 and his Ph.D. from the Virginia Polytechnic Institute and State University in 1975. From April 1975 until June 1984 he was an assistance professor for Appalachian Environmental Laboratory, Center for Environmental and Estuarine Studies at the University of Maryland. Since July 1984, he has been with the Penn State School of Forest Resources, first as an Associate Professor of Fishery Science from July 1984 to June 1988. Then as a Professor of Ichthyology from July 1988 until December 2005. And now as a Distinguished Professor of Ichthyology from January 2007 to the present.

Graduate Faculty
He was elected to the graduate faculty at the University of Maryland in the Fall of 1978 and to the Pennsylvania State University Graduate Faculty in 1984.

Publications
He has published dozens of articles including:
 "River of the Dammed: Longitudinal changes in fish assemblages in response to dams" with Jonathan Freedman, B. D. Lorson, R.B. Taylor, R. F. Carline, J.R. Stauffer
 "Introgression in Lake Malaŵi: Increasing the Threat of Human Urogenital Schistosomiasis?" with Jay R Stauffer, Henry Madsen, David Rollinson
 "Prey species and size choice of the molluscivorous fish, black carp (Mylopharyngodon piceus)" N. M. Hung, J. R. Stauffer, H. Madsen

Awards
Phi Sigma Award.  1974.  For outstanding graduate research in the biological sciences at VPI & SU.
Sigma Xi Research Award, 1974.  For outstanding graduate students and promoting scholarly achievement.
Fulbright Research Scholar 1990-1991 to Malawi, Africa
Fulbright Research Scholar 1995 to Malawi, Africa

Certifications and memberships
Professor Stauffer is certified as a Professional Fisheries Biologist by the American Fisheries Society. He is also a member of the American Institute of Fishery Research Biologists. He has the following affiliations as well:
Association of Southeastern Biologists
American Fisheries Society
American Association of the Advancement of Science Sigma Xi
Pennsylvania Academy of Sciences
American Society of Ichthyologists and Herpetologists
Ecological Society of America
Potomac River Basin Commission 
Society of Systematic Zoologists
American Institute of Biological Sciences
American Society of Naturalists

See also
:Category:Taxa named by Jay Richard Stauffer Jr.

References

Cornell University alumni
Virginia Tech alumni
American ichthyologists
Living people
Year of birth missing (living people)